Fedi is an Italian surname. Notable people with the surname include:

 Andrea Fedi (born 1991), Italian racing cyclist
 Dario Fedi (born 1989), Italian footballer
 Marco Fedi (born 1958), Italian politician
 Pio Fedi (1815–1892), Italian sculptor

See also

 
 Fede (disambiguation)

Italian-language surnames